Qurain City is an area in Kuwait, located in the Mubarak Al-Kabeer Governorate. The name is also an older name of the state of Kuwait.
The name "Qurain" itself means elevated land or hill.

History

Significance during the Iraqi invasion of Kuwait
The suburb is renowned for three neighboring villas of historical significance. They are what make up Al-Qurain Martyrs' Museum. On February 24, 1991, 19 young Kuwaiti men from the "Messila" resistance group had armed themselves and were preparing a strike against the invading Iraqi army. While the men were discussing their plan, an Iraqi patrol unit was in the area and eventually checked on one of the three houses in which the resistance group congregated. The two sides then engaged in a ten-hour battle. Heavily outnumbered and underarmed, the Kuwaiti men were eventually defeated by Iraqi tanks and soldiers. Of the nineteen men, seven were severely wounded and twelve died.

The symbolic thing about this house is that it represented a wide spectrum of Kuwaiti people from different sects and ancestral backgrounds. 

Districts of Mubarak Al-Kabeer Governorate
Populated places in Kuwait